Golinda is a city in Falls and McLennan counties in the U.S. state of Texas. The population was 618 at the 2020 census, up from 559 at the 2010 census.

The McLennan County portion of Golinda is part of the Waco Metropolitan Statistical Area.

Geography

Golinda is located primarily in northern Falls County at  (31.377615, –97.074772). The city limits extend north into southern McLennan County.

U.S. Route 77 passes through Golinda, leading north  to Waco and south  to Cameron.

History

Golinda was the home of Sank Majors, a Black man who was lynched by a white mob in Waco in 1905. According to a contemporary account in The Houston Post, the people in the mob came from the Golinda area.

Demographics

As of the 2020 United States census, there were 618 people, 241 households, and 161 families residing in the city.

As of the census of 2000, there were 423 people, 171 households, and 128 families residing in the city. The population density was 101.8 people per square mile (39.4/km2). There were 185 housing units at an average density of 44.5 per square mile (17.2/km2). The racial makeup of the city was 76.36% White, 19.15% African American, 0.24% Asian, 4.26% from other races. Hispanic or Latino of any race were 8.27% of the population.

There were 171 households, out of which 24.6% had children under the age of 18 living with them, 62.0% were married couples living together, 8.8% had a female householder with no husband present, and 24.6% were non-families. 24.0% of all households were made up of individuals, and 12.9% had someone living alone who was 65 years of age or older. The average household size was 2.47 and the average family size was 2.89.

In the city, the population was spread out, with 20.1% under the age of 18, 7.1% from 18 to 24, 26.2% from 25 to 44, 27.2% from 45 to 64, and 19.4% who were 65 years of age or older. The median age was 42 years. For every 100 females, there were 92.3 males. For every 100 females age 18 and over, there were 89.9 males.

The median income for a household in the city was $32,955, and the median income for a family was $38,472. Males had a median income of $21,979 versus $22,159 for females. The per capita income for the city was $14,136. About 8.8% of families and 7.9% of the population were below the poverty line, including 10.6% of those under age 18 and 13.8% of those age 65 or over.

Education
The Falls County portion of Golinda is served by the Chilton Independent School District. The Robinson Independent School District serves the McLennan County portion of the city.

References

Cities in Falls County, Texas
Cities in McLennan County, Texas
Cities in Texas